Poland Township is one of sixteen townships in Buena Vista County, Iowa, USA.  As of the 2000 census, its population was 529.

Geography
According to the USGS, it contains two cemeteries: Garton Graveyard and Poland.

References

External links
 US-Counties.com
 City-Data.com

Townships in Buena Vista County, Iowa
Townships in Iowa